Carl Abbott (born December 3, 1944) is an American historian and urbanist, specialising in the related fields of urban history, western American history, urban planning, and science fiction, and is a frequent speaker to local community groups. Since 1967 he has been married to Margery Post Abbott, a Quaker scholar and teacher.

Academia 
He received a BA in history from Swarthmore College (1966) and a PhD from the University of Chicago (1971). His academic positions have included the University of Denver (1971–72), Old Dominion University (1972–78), and Portland State University (1978–2012). He has also held visiting positions at Mesa University, George Washington University, and the University of Oregon.

He served as president of the Urban History Association (1995), has been a member of the American Historical Association since 1982 and served as president of its Pacific Coach Branch from 2012 until 2013. Other professional service has included co-editorship of the journal of the American Planning Association from 1999 to 2004 and of the Pacific Historical Review from 1997 to 2014.

Writing 
Abbott has authored or co-authored sixteen books. The Metropolitan Frontier: Cities in the Modern American West (1993) received the book award of the Urban History Association and Political Terrain: Washington D.C. from Tidewater Town to Global Metropolis (1999) received the book award of the Society for American City and Regional Planning History. He has also published many scholarly articles, chapters, and reviews as well as shorter essays for general readers on his website.

Abbott is also active in fields of public history, working with Portland's Architectural Heritage Center, The Oregon Encyclopedia, the Oregon Historical Society, and other organizations and is an advocate of community-based history.

Works 
 Colorado: The History of the Centennial State. Colorado Associated University Press, Boulder 1976. Fifth edition 2013 (with Stephen Leonard and Tom Noel): University of Colorado Press, Boulder 2013, .
 The Great Extravaganza: Portland and the Lewis and Clark Exposition. Oregon Historical Society, Portland 1981, .
 Boosters and Businessmen: Popular Economic Thought and Urban Growth in the Antebellum Middle West. Greenwood Press, Westport CT 1981, .
 The New Urban America: Growth and Politics in Sunbelt Cities. University of North Carolina Press, 1981. Revised edition 1987, .
 Portland: Planning, Politics, and Growth in a Twentieth Century City. University of Nebraska Press, Lincoln NE 1983, .
 Urban America in the Modern Age, 1920 to Present. H. Davidson, Arlington Heights IL 1987. 2nd edition 2007, .
 The Metropolitan Frontier: Cities in the Modern American West. University of Arizona Press, Tucson 1993, .
 Planning a New West: The Columbia River Gorge National Scenic Area (with Sy Adler and Margery Post Abbott). Oregon State University Press, Corvallis 1997. .
 Political Terrain: Washington, D.C., from Tidewater Town to Global Metropolis. University of North Carolina Press, Chapel Hill 1999, .
 Greater Portland: Urban Life and Landscape in the Pacific Northwest. University of Pennsylvania Press, Philadelphia 2001, .
 Two Centuries of Lewis and Clark: Reflections on the Voyage of Discovery (with William L. Lang). Oregon Historical Society Press, Portland 2004, .
 Frontiers Past and Future: Science Fiction and the American West. University Press of Kansas, Lawrence KS 2006, .
 How Cities Won the West: Four Centuries of Urban Change in Western North America. University of New Mexico Press, Albuquerque 2008, .
 Portland in Three Centuries: The Place and the People. Oregon State University Press, Corvallis 2011. 
 Imagined Frontiers: Contemporary America and Beyond. University of Oklahoma Press, Norman 2015, 
 Imagining Urban Futures: Cities in Science Fiction and What We Might Learn from Them. Wesleyan University Press, Middletown, CT 2016.

References 

Living people
1944 births
Urban historians
American Historical Association
21st-century American historians
21st-century American male writers
University of Chicago alumni
Swarthmore College alumni
University of Denver people
Old Dominion University faculty
Portland State University faculty
Colorado Mesa University
George Washington University faculty
University of Oregon people
American male non-fiction writers